Jonas Fahlenius (30 October 1674 - 11 October 1748) was a Swedish philosopher, theologian and Bishop of Turku from 1734 till 1746.

Biography
Fahlenius was born on 30 October 1674 in Falun in the Swedish Empire, the son of a priest and teacher Niklas Håkansson Fahlenius and his wife Brita Jonasdotter Fahlberg. After basic education at Falun Trivial School, in 1695 he commenced studies at Uppsala University from where he graduated with his Masters in 1707. In 1712 he became an assistant professor of theology in Uppsala University. By royal decree in 1721, he became the Professor of Logic and Metaphysics at the Royal Academy of Turku, from where he also achieved his Doctor of Theology in 1732.

On 18 March 1734 he was appointed Bishop of Turku and was consecrated some time later that year by Archbishop Johannes Steuchius. He resigned as Bishop of Turku in 1746 after he suffered a stroke. Fahlenius married twice, but only had children from the second marriage, with Sara Charlotta Teppati, daughter of Carl Teppati and Sidonia Stiernstedt. One of his daughters was the mother of Abraham Niclas Edelcrantz, poet and inventor. Fahlenius is buried in Turku Cathedral along with his second wife and two of their children.

References

Lutheran archbishops and bishops of Turku
1674 births
1748 deaths
Swedish Lutheran bishops